The Aréthuse was an Italian-built 40-gun frigate of the French Navy.

Aréthuse was built in 1790, and offered to France by Ferdinand I on 14 July 1801.

She was decommissioned on 27 October 1802 and returned to Ferdinand I, along with Sibille and Cérès.

Sources and references 
 Les bâtiments ayant porté le nom d'Aréthuse, netmarine.net

Age of Sail frigates of France
Ships built in Naples
1790 ships